The Fairfax Theatre is a mixed-use Art Deco style building constructed in 1930. The building is located in Los Angeles' Fairfax District on the northwest corner of Fairfax Ave, and Beverly Blvd. In 2021, the Fairfax Theatre was added to the list of Los Angeles Historic-Cultural Monuments, and declared eligible for the National Register of Historic Places. The building is recognized both for its importance to the Jewish heritage of the Fairfax district as well as for its Art Deco architecture.

History 
Completed in 1930, the Fairfax Theatre is a multi-purpose building consisting of a cinema triplex, retail shops, and second floor offices. The Fairfax was developed by Nelson C. Stein, who owned the building until 1960. It was the first movie theatre, and one of the first commercial and professional buildings in the Beverly-Fairfax neighborhood. Between 1930 and 1969, the Fairfax Theatre played an important role as a building where fundraisers were held to support the migration of Jewish cultural institutions from Boyle Heights to the Beverly Fairfax neighborhood. The theatre was essential for fundraising for local Jewish synagogues, temples, clubs, and charities. Some of the earliest fundraisers were held for synagogues, including Etz Jacob and Fairfax Temple in 1933, and the Western Jewish Institute (later Congregation Shaarei Tefila) in 1934. Beverly-Fairfax Jewish Community Center (JCC) was another important institution to raise funds at the building. The first benefits for the JCC held at the Fairfax Theatre were in 1935, prior to the Beverly-Fairfax JCC opening in 1943.

Businesses catering to the area's Jewish population began appearing on Fairfax starting with the construction of the Fairfax Theatre in 1930, accelerating greatly after World War II. The Fairfax Theatre, which features 13 retail storefronts, was home to the first Jewish delicatessen, the first Jewish bakery, and the first kosher meat market on Fairfax.

The Fairfax Theatre debuted on March 26, 1930 with the premier of "Troopers Three", a Tiffany Productions movie starring Rex Lease. The theatre was leased to the Fairfax Theatre Company, Inc who operated several other theatres in LA. Well-known celebrities of their day would perform at the Fairfax Theatre, including Eddie Cantor, George Jessel, and Gene Autry.

Design 
On October 20, 1929 the LA Times announced that William Simpson & Co. had finally begun construction on the theatre, with a capacity of 1,500 seats at a cost of $150,000. The Art Deco style building was designed by W.C. Pennel, who designed hundreds of commercial and residential projects in LA. The Fairfax Theatre retains all aspects of historic integrity and integrity of workmanship

The primary façades utilize a repeating angled motif which creates a strong zig-zag aesthetic typical of Art Deco architecture. The marquee is supported by its original 1930 iron braces, and consists of neon lights and Plexiglas lettering, with a coffered ceiling inset, a sunburst pattern and recessed lights. The entrance has a large open lobby surfaced with red tile and reeded pilasters and contains a terrazzo floor exhibiting a starburst pattern. A Regency-style ticket booth decorates the front of the lobby. The main theater is the most intact portion of the entire theater. It retains the original proscenium arch and decorative organ screens which consist of a lattice of interlocking chevrons and diamonds painted gold. The exits to the theatre are dated from 1946 and are topped by two large rococo scroll pelmets. The ceiling is metal lathe and plaster with a recessed central panel framed with a decorative cornice featuring an Art Deco metal light fixture.

Preservation efforts 
In 2010, the Regency Theaters was forced to shut down due to a leaky roof, leaving the Fairfax Theatre vacant for more than a decade. A proposed redevelopment project that was approved approximately ten years ago currently threatens the Fairfax Theatre.

In 2010, preservationists from a group called Friends of the Fairfax Theatre tried to have the building designated as historic, but the LA Cultural Heritage Commission denied the application. Since then, new information was discovered through previously unavailable archives about the extensive history of the building and its cultural significance to the Jewish community living in Beverly-Fairfax.

On July 30th, 2021, the State Historic Resources Commission voted unanimously to add the theatre to the National Register of Historic Places. The nomination for the National Register of Historic Places was supported by members of UCLA's Mapping Jewish LA Project, the president of Hadassah of Southern California, and the Holocaust Museum of LA, and Councilmember Paul Koretz.

The LA City Council voted unanimously to add the Fairfax Theatre to the list of LA Historic-Cultural Monuments on December 7th, 2021. The Art Deco Society of LA teamed up with Save Beverly Fairfax to get the Fairfax Theatre a historical designation. The LA Conservancy, Hollywood Heritage, and LA Historic Theatre Foundation have been key supporters. Preservationist Steven Luftman filed the application for historic status with the city.

References 

Theatres in Los Angeles
1930 establishments in California
Buildings and structures in Los Angeles
Art Deco architecture in California
Fairfax, Los Angeles